Protovermileo is a genus of wormlion in the family Vermileonidae.

Species
Protovermileo electricus Hennig, 1967

References

Brachycera genera
Taxa named by Willi Hennig
Vermileonomorpha